The Premier League Save of the Month is an association football award that recognises the goalkeeper deemed to have made the best Premier League save in each month of the season from August to April. For sponsorship purposes, it has been called the Castrol Save of the Month since its inception during the 2022–23 season. In August 2022, the Premier League Save of the Month was first awarded, with Nick Pope of Newcastle United its inaugural recipient. Manchester United goalkeeper David de Gea is also the most recipient of the award in February 2023.

Winners

Awards won by player

Awards won by club

Awards won by nationality

See also 
 Premier League Save of the Season

References

Save of the Month
Save of the Month
Association football player non-biographical articles